Zelená knížka is a 1948 Czechoslovak film. The film starred Josef Kemr.

References

External links
 

1948 films
1940s Czech-language films
Czechoslovak black-and-white films
Czechoslovak drama films
1948 drama films
1940s Czech films